Garris is a surname. Notable people with the surname include:

 Eric Garris (born 1953), American libertarian activist
 John Garris (born 1959), American basketball player
 Kiwane Garris (born 1974), American basketball player
 Mick Garris (born 1951), American filmmaker 
 Stefano Garris (born 1979), German basketball player